K80 or K-80 may refer to:

K-80 (Kansas highway), a state highway in Kansas

See also
Substitution model